Lavu is a Loloish language of Yongsheng County, Yunnan, China.

Languages related to Lavu include Liude 六得, Nazha 纳渣, and perhaps Shuitian 水田, Zhili 支里, Luo 倮, Ziyi 子彝, and Liming 黎明.

References

Loloish languages
Languages of China